Sarcolemmal membrane-associated protein is a protein that in humans is encoded by the SLMAP gene.

Interactions 

SLMAP has been shown to interact with STK24.

References

Further reading